The History of Western New Guinea refers to the history of the Indonesian western half of the island of New Guinea and other smaller islands to its west. This region was previously named Irian Jaya. The eastern half of the island is Papua New Guinea.

Human habitation is estimated to have begun between 42,000 and 48,000 years ago. Trade between New Guinea and neighboring Indonesian islands was documented as early as the seventh century, and archipelagic rule of New Guinea by the 13th. The Netherlands made claim to the region and commenced missionary work in nineteenth century. The region was incorporated into the Indonesian republic in the 1960s. Following the 1998 commencement of reforms across Indonesia, Papua and other Indonesian provinces received greater regional autonomy. In 2001, "Special Autonomy" status was granted to the region, although to date, implementation has been partial. The region was divided into the provinces of Papua and West Papua in 2003.

Pre-colonial history
Papuan habitation of the region is estimated to have begun between 42,000 and 48,000 years ago. Austronesian peoples migrating through Maritime Southeast Asia settled several thousand years ago. These groups have developed diverse cultures and languages in situ; there are over 300 languages and two hundred additional dialects in the region.

At the beginning of the seventh century, the Sumatra-based empire of Srivijaya (7th century–13th century) engaged in trade relations with western New Guinea, initially taking items like sandalwood and birds-of-paradise in tribute to China, but later making slaves out of the natives. The rule of the Java-based empire of Majapahit (1293–1527) extended to the western fringes of New Guinea. The 14th-century Majapahit poem Nagarakretagama mentioned Wwanin or Onin as one of recognized territory in the east, today identified as Onin peninsula in Fakfak Regency, western part of larger Bomberai Peninsula, south of Bird's Head region of West Papua. Wanin or Onin was probably the oldest name in recorded history to refer to the western part of the island of New Guinea.

From at least the 15th century (or even earlier), Southeast Asian Muslim merchants and Papuans interacted for trade. From Sultanates located in the Moluccas, Muslim merchants developed exclusive trading ties with the natives of West Papua by the 17th century. Around the 16th century, knowledge of ironworking reached the region, introduced by Muslims from Maluku.

On 13 June 1545, Ortiz de Retez, in command of the San Juan, left port in Tidore, an island of the East Indies and sailed to reach the northern coast of the island of New Guinea, which he ventured along as far as the mouth of the Mamberamo River. He took possession of the land for the Spanish Crown, in the process giving the island the name by which it is known today. He called it Nueva Guinea owing to the resemblance of the local inhabitants to the peoples of the Guinea coast in West Africa.

Netherlands New Guinea 

In 1660, the Dutch recognised the Sultan of Tidore's sovereignty over New Guinea. New Guinea thus became notionally Dutch as the Dutch held power over Tidore. In 1793, Britain attempted to establish a settlement near Manokwari, however, it failed and by 1824 Britain and the Netherlands agreed that the western half of the island would become part of the Dutch East Indies. In 1828 the Dutch established a settlement in Lobo (near Kaimana) which also failed. Almost 30 years later, Germans established the first missionary settlement on an island near Manokwari. While in 1828 the Dutch claimed the south coast west of the 141st meridian and the north coast west of Humboldt Bay in 1848, they did not try to develop the region again until 1896; they established settlements in Manokwari and Fak-Fak in response to perceived Australian ownership claims from the eastern half of New Guinea. Great Britain and Germany had recognised the Dutch claims in treaties of 1885 and 1895. At much the same time, Britain claimed south-east New Guinea, later known as the Territory of Papua, and Germany claimed the northeast, later known as the Territory of New Guinea.

Dutch activity in the region remained in the first half of the twentieth century, notwithstanding the 1923 establishment of the Nieuw Guinea Beweging (New Guinea Movement) in the Netherlands by ultra right-wing supporters calling for Dutchmen to create a tropical Netherlands in Papua. This prewar movement without full government support was largely unsuccessful in its drive, but did coincide with the development of a plan for Eurasian settlement of the Dutch Indies to establish Dutch farms in northern West New Guinea. This effort also failed as most returned to Java disillusioned, and by 1938 just 50 settlers remained near Hollandia and 258 in Manokwari.  The Dutch established the Boven Digul camp in Tanahmerah, in Dutch New Guinea, as a prison for Indonesian nationalists.

World War II
The region became important in the War in the Pacific upon the Netherlands' declaration of war on Japan after the bombing of Pearl Harbor. In 1942, the northern coast of West New Guinea and the nearby islands were occupied by Japan.

In 1944, forces led by American general Douglas MacArthur launched a four-phase campaign from neighbouring Papua New Guinea to liberate Dutch New Guinea from the Japanese. Phase 1 was the capture of Hollandia (now Jayapura). Involving 80,000 Allied troops, it was the largest amphibious operation of the war in the southwest Pacific. Phase 2 was the capture of Sarmi and was met with strong Japanese resistance. The capture of Biak to control the airfield and nearby Numfor was Phase 3. Hard battles were fought on Biak which was exacerbated by Allied intelligence underestimating the strength of Japanese forces. The fourth and final phase was the push to Japanese airbases on Morotai and towards the Philippines. The Allies also fought for control of Merauke as they feared it could be used as a base for Japanese air attacks against Australia.

With local approval, the United States constructed a headquarters for Gen. Douglas MacArthur at Hollandia (now Jayapura) and over twenty US bases and hospitals intended as a staging point for operations taking of the Philippines. West New Guinean farms supplied food for the half million US troops. Papuan men went into battle to carry the wounded, acted as guides and translators, and provided a range of services, from construction work and carpentry to serving as machine shop workers and mechanics.

Following the end of the war, the Dutch retained possession of West New Guinea from 1945.

Indonesian independence
Upon the Japanese surrender in the Pacific, Indonesian nationalists declared Indonesian independence and claimed all of the territory of the Dutch East Indies, including western New Guinea, as part of the Republic of Indonesia. A four and half-year diplomatic and armed struggle ensued between the Dutch and Indonesian republicans. Some nationalists even founded the New Guinea-based political parties, such as Indonesian Irian Independence Party (PKII) which was founded by Silas Papare in 1946. It ended in December 1949 with the Netherlands recognising Indonesian sovereignty over the Dutch East Indies with the exception of Dutch New Guinea. Unable to reach a compromise on the region, the conference closed with the parties agreeing to discuss the issue within one year.

In December 1950 the United Nations requested the Special Committee on Decolonization to accept transmission of information regarding the territory in accord with Article 73 of the Charter of the United Nations. After repeated Indonesian claims to possession of Dutch New Guinea, the Netherlands invited Indonesia to present its claim before an International Court of Law. Indonesia declined the offer. In attempt to prevent Indonesia taking control of the region, the Dutch significantly raised development spending off its low base, and encouraged Papuan nationalism. They began building schools and colleges to train professional skills with the aim of preparing them for self-rule by 1970. A naval academy was opened in 1956, and Papuan troops and naval cadets began service by 1957. A small western elite developed with a growing political awareness attuned to the idea of independence and close links to neighbouring eastern New Guinea which was administered by Australia. Local Council elections were held and Papuan representatives elected from 1955.

After news that the Hague was considering a United States plan to trade the territory to United Nations administration, Papuan Councillors met for six hours in the New Guinea Council building on 19 October 1961 to elect a National Committee which drafted a Manifesto for Independence & Self-government, a National flag (Morning Star), State Seal, selected a national anthem ("Oh My Land Papua"), and called for the people to be known as Papuans. The New Guinea Council voted unanimous support of these proposals on 30 October 1961, and on 31 October 1961 presented the Morning Star flag and Manifesto to Governor Platteel, who recognized the flag and anthem on 18 November 1961, and these ordinances came into effect on 1 December 1961.

Incorporation into Indonesia 

Sukarno took over western New Guinea a focus of his continuing struggle against Dutch imperialism and part of a broader Third World conflict with Western imperialists. Both of Sukarno's key pillars of support, the Indonesian Communist Party and Indonesian army supported his expansionism. In December 1961, President Sukarno created a Supreme Operations Command for the "liberation of Irian". In January 1962, Suharto, recently promoted to major General, was appointed to lead Operation Mandala, a joint army-navy-air force command. This formed the military side of the Indonesian campaign to win the territory. Indonesian forces had previously infiltrated the territory using small boats from nearby islands. Operations Pasukan Gerilya 100 (November 1960) and Pasukan Gerilya 200 (September 1961), were followed around the time of Suharto's appointment by Pasukan Gerilya 300 with 115 troops leaving Jakarta on four Jaguar class torpedo boats (15 January). They were intercepted in the Aru Sea and the lead boat was sunk. 51 survivors were picked up after flotilla commander Commodore Yos Sudarso went down with his boat. Parachute drops were made onto the swampy south coast away from the main concentration of Dutch forces. The commandos were thwarted by tall trees on which they were snared and by the swampy terrain which made them wet and ill, and their equipment was lost and damaged. Having been prepared for eventual independence by the Dutch, Papuan fighters attacked the paratroopers or handed them over to Dutch authorities. Of the 1,429 troops dropped into the region, 216 were killed or never found, and 296 were captured.

While Dutch casualties were relatively few, they knew that a military campaign to retain the region would require protracted jungle warfare. Unwilling to repeat the events of 1945–1949, the Dutch agreed to American mediation. Supporting the secret talks was the new American president, John F Kennedy, who said that compromise "will inevitably be unsatisfactory in some degree to both sides".  Kennedy took the advice of American ambassador to Indonesia, Howard Jones, and that of his own National Security Council, which was counter to the views of the Dutch and the CIA. Kennedy sent his brother Robert to Jakarta to solicit entry into negotiations without pre-conditions. Sukarno had hinted at releasing Allen Pope, who was sentenced to death for bombing Ambon four years previously, however, he now offered to release Pope in exchange for America's support against the Dutch.

In July 1962, Suharto's Mandala Command was preparing to resolve the military campaign with a major combined air and sea assault on the trade and communications centre of Biak Island, which was the location of a Dutch military base and the only jet airstrip. However, this risky operation did not eventuate as continuing US efforts to have the Netherlands secretly negotiate the transfer of the territory to Indonesian administration succeeded in creating the "New York Agreement", which was signed on 15 August 1962. The Australian government, which had previously supported of Papuan independence, also reversed its policy to support incorporation with Indonesia.

The vaguely worded agreement, ratified in the UN on 21 September 1962, required authority to be transferred to a United Nations Temporary Executive Authority (UNTEA) on 1 October 1962, and that once UNTEA had informed the public of the terms of the Agreement, administration of the territory would transfer to Indonesia after 1 May 1963, until such time as Indonesia allowed the Papuans to determine whether they wanted independence or be part of Indonesia. The New York Agreement specified that all men and women in Papua that were not foreign nationals had the right to vote in the Act. On 1 May 1963, UNTEA transferred total administration of West New Guinea to the Republic of Indonesia. The capital Hollandia was renamed Kota Baru for the transfer to Indonesian administration and on 5 September 1963, West Irian was declared a "quarantine territory" with Foreign Minister Subandrio administrating visitor permits.

In 1969, the United Nations supervised the Act of Free Choice which was due to be a free vote for every single West Papuan man and woman who had the right to choose independence or integration with Indonesia. General Sarwo Edhi Wibowo instead handpicked 1025 Melanesian men out of an estimated population of 800,000 as the Western New Guinea representatives for the vote and announced that the representatives had voted "unanimously" for integration. Soon after, the region was renamed "West Irian" and became the 26th province of Indonesia.

Indonesian governance 

From the first days of integration to Indonesia, some of the people in the region refused to be part of Indonesia and have pushed for independence ever since. There are regular mass protests throughout West Papua in support of independence but the Indonesian military and police often use lethal force to disperse them. The Free Papua Movement (OPM) was set up to provide a formal resistance towards Indonesian rule. Local and international protest followed the impact of human rights abuses and transmigration by other Indonesians into the region. Since the 1960s, consistent reports have filtered out of the territory of government suppression and terrorism, including murder, political assassination, imprisonment, torture, and aerial bombardments. The Indonesian government disbanded the New Guinea Council and forbade the use of the West Papua flag or the singing of the national anthem. There has been resistance to Indonesian integration, both through civil disobedience (such as Morning Star flag raising ceremonies) and via the formation of the Organisasi Papua Merdeka (OPM, or Free Papua Movement) in 1965. Estimates vary on the total death toll of West Papuans by the Indonesian military with wild variation in the number claimed dead. 
In almost all estimates, under International law the death toll amounts to genocide of the people of West Papua by Indonesia. 
A Sydney University academic has estimated more than 100,000 Papuans, one sixteenth of the population, have died as a result of government-sponsored violence against West Papuans, while others had previously specified much higher death tolls.
An increasingly common figure being used is 500,000 people.

In the 1970s and 1980s, the Indonesian government accelerated its transmigration program, under which tens of thousands of Javanese and Sumatran migrants were resettled to Papua. Prior to Indonesian rule, the non-indigenous population was estimated at 16,600; while the Papuan population were a mix of Roman Catholics, Protestants and animists following tribal religions. The transmigration program officially ended in the late 1990s. An independence congress in 2000 again calling for independence resulted in a military crackdown on independence supporters.

During the Abdurrahman Wahid administration in 2000, aside from changing the province name from "Irian Jaya" to "Papua", Papua gained a "Special Autonomy" status, an attempted political compromise between Papuans and the central government that has weak support within the Jakarta government. Despite lack of political will of politicians in Jakarta to proceed with real implementation of the Special Autonomy, which is stipulated by law, the region was divided into two provinces: the province of Papua and the province of West Papua, based on a Presidential Instruction in January 2001, soon after President Wahid was impeached by the Parliament and replaced by Vice President Megawati Sukarnoputri. However, some Papuans refuse any promises of autonomy from Indonesia as they are instead demanding independence, and a free referendum for all Papuans to determine whether they choose independence or not.

See also

References
 
 McDonald, H., Suharto's Indonesia, Fontana Books, 1980, Blackburn, Australia,

Notes